Tomorrow Tonight is an Australian comedy panel discussion television show hosted by Annabel Crabb, Charlie Pickering and Adam Liaw. The show features a panel of experts and comedians who discuss a hypothetical news story from tomorrow's headlines. Together they try to solve the world's problems before they even happen.

The show premiered on ABC in October 2018, with Crabb and Pickering as co-hosts. After a 3 year absence it was scheduled to return in 2022 but disruptions caused by ongoing COVID-19 restrictions delayed its return to the following year. Adam Liaw joined the cast in 2022.

Format
The show airs several segments throughout the episode to create a hypothetical or fake news story, and in the process raises moral dilemmas that are fictional yet convincing.
The hypothetical news story is shown to three guest panellists and permanent panellist Annabel Crabb. The host (Charlie Pickering) holds a neutral position and questions each panellist as to how they will approach the issues raised. The news story gradually unfolds in various segments during the episode and culminates in a humorous potential aftermath featuring one of the guest panellists.

Episodes

Season 1 (2018)

Season 2 (2022)

See also

The Project (Australian TV program)

References

External links
 

Australian Broadcasting Corporation original programming
2018 Australian television series debuts
English-language television shows
Australian comedy television series
Television shows set in Melbourne